Geoffrey Lancashire (12 March 1933 – 3 October 2004) was a British television scriptwriter. He is best remembered for writing television comedy series such as The Lovers and The Cuckoo Waltz. He also wrote 171 episodes of ITV soap opera Coronation Street during the 1960s.

Early life
Geoffrey Lancashire was born in Oldham, Lancashire on 12 March 1933 and was educated at the local high school until the age of 15.

Career
Lancashire began his career as a journalist with the Oldham Evening Chronicle newspaper and prior to working in London for national Sunday newspapers, he with a journalist colleague, Roy Bottomley, founded the Oldham Mirror newspaper.

Lancashire was a freelance journalist before joining Granada Television as a  continuity scriptwriter days before the company began broadcasting in 1956. He went on to write 171 episodes of Coronation Street, working alongside Tony Warren and Jack Rosenthal. Lancashire also wrote other television series including Inheritance (1967), The Lovers (1970), Shabby Tiger (1973), The Cuckoo Waltz (1975) and Foxy Lady (1982). He had an aptitude for writing and devising television comedy, and with Rosenthal won a Writers' Guild award for The Lovers.

Having become self-employed once again, Lancashire wrote for other television companies. His output included contributions to the BBC's 1965-67 United!, Man at the Top (Thames Television, 1970–72) and All Creatures Great and Small (BBC, 1978–1990).

Personal life
In February 1963, Lancashire married Hilda McCormack, a secretary at the Granada Television studios. He suffered a series of strokes late in his life. He never fully recovered and lived at Denville Hall, a nursing home for people from the television and theatrical professions. He died at Watford General Hospital on 3 October 2004 and was survived by Hilda, his actor daughter Sarah and her twin brother, and two other sons.

References
Notes

Citations

External links
 
 Profile, televisionheaven.co.uk

1933 births
2004 deaths
English television writers
People from Oldham
English journalists
Soap opera writers
British comedy writers
20th-century English screenwriters